Anton Yuriyovych Kalaytan (born 12 November 1998) is a Ukrainian professional footballer who plays as a right winger for Ukrainian Second League club Rubikon Kyiv.

References

External links
 
 

1998 births
Living people
Footballers from Kyiv
Ukrainian footballers
Association football forwards
FC Arsenal Kyiv players
Tennis Borussia Berlin players
FC Rubikon Kyiv players
FC Metalist 1925 Kharkiv players
FC Bukovyna Chernivtsi players
FC Olimpik Donetsk players
Ukrainian First League players
Ukrainian Second League players
Ukrainian Amateur Football Championship players
Ukrainian expatriate footballers
Expatriate footballers in Romania
Ukrainian expatriate sportspeople in Romania
Expatriate footballers in Germany
Ukrainian expatriate sportspeople in Germany